Miss America 2016, the 89th Miss America pageant, was held at the Boardwalk Hall in Atlantic City, New Jersey on Sunday, September 13, 2015. It was broadcast on ABC and streamed to mobile devices and Xbox 360 consoles via the WatchABC app. Tickets for the 2016 Miss America competition went on sale June 5, 2015.

Kira Kazantsev (Miss New York 2014) crowned her successor,  Miss Georgia 2015,  Betty Cantrell at the end of the two-hour nationally televised event. According to Miss America's website, the pageant got around 7.9 million views.

Overview

There were 52 women competing for the title, down from 53 contestants in the 2014 pageant, as the Miss Virgin Islands pageant organization did not renew their license and is no longer sending representatives for the Miss America pageant.

The panel of preliminary competition judges included publicist and talent producer Brian Edwards, Miss America 1979 Kylene Barker, producer Jenni Pulos, fashion and style expert Rachel Zalis, fashion designer Noah Alexander, D.C. lobbyist Lanny Griffith, and actor/model James Brown III.

Vanessa Williams (who was crowned Miss America 1984 but was forced to resign a few weeks before her reign ended) served as head judge and performed Oh How the Years Go By.  The pageant began with Miss America CEO Sam Haskell issuing an apology to Williams, telling her that although "none of us currently in the organization were involved then, on behalf of today's organization, I want to apologize to you and to your mother, Miss Helen Williams. I want to apologize for anything that was said or done that made you feel any less the Miss America you are and the Miss America you always will be." Suzette Charles (Williams' replacement)  said in an interview with Inside Edition that she was perplexed over the apology and suggested that it was given for the purpose of ratings. Williams also commented on the events surrounding her return, stating in an interview with Robin Roberts that "there's a lot of people who feel I should return, so the people who harbor the resentment I understand it but realize that all of those people that were part of the old guard are no longer there."

Results

Placements

* - America's Choice

Order of announcements

Top 15

Top 12

Top 10

Top 7

Awards

Preliminary awards

Quality of Life award

Other awards

Contestants

Pageant notes

Withdraws
 - Due to lack of sponsorships

Notes

External links
Vanessa Williams and Her Mother Receive an Apology From Miss America Organization - ABC News, September 14, 2015.

2016
September 2015 events in the United States
2015 beauty pageants
2015 in New Jersey
Vanessa Williams
Events in Atlantic City, New Jersey